Happy Love Sick is the debut solo album by Shifty Shellshock who is best known as frontman of rap rock band Crazy Town. The album includes the original singles "Slide Along Side" and "Turning Me On". The single "Starry Eyed Surprise", a collaboration between Paul Oakenfold and Shellshock that was originally released in 2002 on Oakenfold's album Bunkka, also appears on this CD.

Musical style and reception
Regarding his new direction on the album, Shellshock stated to the Los Angeles Times in 2004 "I tried to remove the heavy rock element [of Crazy Town]. This is more surfer hip-hop: hip-hop with reggae overtones, some dance music and R&B influences." Tim Sendra of Allmusic ranked the album 3.5 stars out of 5 and wrote in his review that while Happy Love Sick was marred by a somewhat repetitive series of songs, it was nonetheless "a surprisingly good album that should be a feature at late-summer slow drags, beach bonfires, and freshman mixers."

Track listing

Singles

References

2004 debut albums
Albums produced by the Neptunes
Maverick Records albums
Shifty Shellshock albums